The Polar Cup is a Listed flat horse race in Norway open to thoroughbreds aged three years or older. It is run over a distance of 1,370 metres (6 furlongs and 178 yards) at Øvrevoll in late August.

History
The event was formerly known as the Polar Million Cup. It used to have a prize fund of one million kroner. For a period it held Listed status.

The Polar Million Cup was promoted to Group 3 level in 2001. That year's edition was the first Group race to be staged in Norway. The country's second Group race, the Marit Sveaas Minneløp, was run later in the same month.

The title of the race was shortened to Polar Cup in 2003. From this point its prize money was less than a million kroner. It was downgraded to Listed level from the 2020 running.

Records
Most successful horse (3 wins):
 Duca di Como - 2019, 2020, 2021

Leading jockey since 1998 (3 wins):

 Elione Chaves - Duca di Como (2019, 2020, 2021)

Leading trainer since 1998 (5 wins):

 Cathrine Erichsen - Hovman (2007), Easy Road (2015), Duca di Como (2019, 2020, 2021)

Winners since 1998

See also
 List of Scandinavian flat horse races

References

 Racing Post:
 galopp-sieger.de – Polar Cup.
 horseracingintfed.com – International Federation of Horseracing Authorities – Polar Cup (2018).
 ovrevoll.no – Polar Cup.
 pedigreequery.com – Polar Million Cup – Øvrevoll.
 pedigreequery.com – Polar Cup – Øvrevoll.

Open sprint category horse races
Sport in Bærum
Horse races in Norway
Summer events in Norway